Grahame Leviston McConechy (6 June 1880 – 27 July 1942) was an Australian rules footballer who played in the Victorian Football League for Collingwood Football Club.

A forward, McConechy only managed to play seven games in the 1904 VFL season for the Collingwood after being recruited from Port Melbourne via Middlepark Wesleys.

References

External links

Collingwood Football Club players
Port Melbourne Football Club players
Australian rules footballers from Victoria (Australia)
1880 births
1942 deaths